A Drink Before the War is a crime novel by American writer Dennis Lehane,  published in 1994. It was his debut novel. It is the first book in a series focusing on private investigators Patrick Kenzie and Angela Gennaro.

Plot introduction

Private Investigators Kenzie and Gennaro are tasked to retrieve missing documents by a trio of politicians. The trail leads them into the midst of a gang war and reveals an act of child abuse. Kenzie struggles with memories of his own past while Gennaro deals with her abusive marriage.

Plot summary
Boston private detectives Patrick Kenzie and Angela Gennaro receive a job from three state politicians, Sterling Mulkern, Jim Vurnan and Brian Paulson, to recover documents from a former cleaning lady, Jenna Angeline. Tracking Angeline to her sister's house outside Boston, they learn she has hidden the documents in a safe deposit box in a bank back in the city. Kenzie escorts Angeline to the bank, where she gives him one photo before being gunned down by Curtis Moore, a street enforcer for notorious gangster and pimp Marion Socia. The photo shows Socia with Paulson, who has stripped down to his socks and underwear. Angeline had only hidden one photo in the safe deposit box, and it is up to Kenzie and Gennaro to find the rest.

The ensuing investigation takes the detectives from swanky Boston hotels to housing projects in the poorest ghettos of Dorchester. Kenzie wrestles with problems of race, class, urban violence, corruption, abuse, and love. A gang war erupts between Socia and his son Roland, who has taken his own gang independent, culminating in the bloodiest night of gang violence in Boston history. A street terrorism bill that would have curbed the violence is suspiciously stalled before coming to a vote. All these events are connected to the photographs, and as they pursue the evidence, Kenzie and Gennaro find themselves hunted by both sides.

Eventually the detectives find the photos, and learn that Socia prostituted his young son with Angeline to Paulson years ago, ironically leading the boy to become a stone-cold killer. Roland gains the upper hand in the war, and Socia demands the pictures back, hoping to blackmail Roland and save himself. At a meeting with Socia, Kenzie loses control and kills him. Releasing a photo to the press with Roland's face obscured so that he will not lose his street cred and grip on his gang, Paulson is disgraced, and a victorious Roland agrees not to come after Kenzie and Gennaro.

Characters
Patrick Kenzie: A Boston-based private detective from Dorchester. Kenzie works with his lifelong friend Angie Gennaro from an office in a neighborhood church.
Angela Gennaro: A tough, street-wise detective who grew up with Kenzie. Angie is in an abusive marriage with Phil, a former friend of Kenzie's.
Bubba Rogowski: Local gunrunner, sociopath, and urban terrorist, Rugowski provides added muscle for the detectives.
Devin Amronklin: A detective on the Anti-Gang task force, he is intent on ending the war by any means necessary.
Richie Colgan: A black journalist at a local paper and longtime friend of Patrick, he has made his career reporting on local politicians.
Marion Socia: Leader of the Ravens street gang and a crack dealer and former pimp.
Jenna Angeline: Cleaning lady who worked for Senator Paulson, married to Marion Socia and mother of Roland.
Roland: Leader of the Angel Avengers gang, fighting a war with his father Socia.
Sterling Mulkern, Jim Vurnan, and Brian Paulson: Trio of Massachusetts state politicians who hire Kenzie to hunt down Jenna Angeline.

Major themes

Themes of the novel include racial and class warfare and the effect of blue collar bitterness in father figures.

Literary significance and reception
The New York Times described the book as somewhat clichéd but praised the honest approach to racial and class warfare. They also felt that the seriousness of the novel's themes made a jarring contrast with the flippancy of the detective characters.

Explanation of the title

The title refers to the gang war that is central to the plot. It is from a line spoken by the character Devin midway through the novel.
It is taken from the BBC sitcom Fawlty Towers, and the episode 'The Germans'. The same title is used by Sinead O'Connor for a song on her first album.

Awards and nominations
Dennis Lehane received a Shamus Award for best first detective novel for the book.

References

External links
A Drink Before the War at dennislehanebooks.com

1994 American novels
Novels by Dennis Lehane
Novels set in Boston
Shamus Award-winning works
1994 debut novels